Northsound 1 is an Independent Local Radio station based in Aberdeen, Scotland, owned and operated by Bauer as part of the Hits Radio network. It broadcasts to Aberdeenshire and North East Scotland.

As of September 2022, the station has a weekly audience of 114,000 listeners according to RAJAR.

History

Northsound Radio commenced broadcasting at 6 am on 27 July 1981 from converted studios in an old schoolhouse on Kings Gate, near Anderson Drive in Aberdeen. Originally, the station was broadcast from 6am to 8pm each day on 1035 kHz (290 metres) and 96.9 FM (VHF).

In 1995, the station split its services to become Northsound 1 and Northsound 2. Both stations now also broadcast online, on smartphone applications and DAB (Digital Audio Broadcasting – i.e. Digital Radio).

Programming
Local programming is produced and broadcast from Northsound's Aberdeen studios from 6am-10am weekdays.

Northsound 1 also airs networked programming from Clyde 1 in Clydebank, Forth 1 in Edinburgh, Tay FM in Dundee and Hits Radio in Manchester.

The station's local presenters are Jeff Diack and Lauren Mitchell (Northsound 1 Breakfast).

News and sport
Northsound 1 broadcasts local news bulletins hourly from 6am to 7pm on weekdays and from 7am to 1pm at weekends. Headlines are broadcast on the half hour during weekday breakfast and drivetime shows, alongside sport, traffic and business bulletins.

National bulletins from Sky News Radio are carried overnight with networked Scottish bulletins at weekends, produced from Radio Clyde's newsroom in Clydebank.

Extended sports coverage airs under the Superscoreboard banner on Saturday afternoons.

See also 
 Northsound 2
 Northsound Radio

References

External links
 Northsound 1

Bauer Radio
Hits Radio
Radio stations in Aberdeen
Radio stations established in 1981